Alexandre Ribeiro (born January 20, 1981) is a Brazilian Jiu-Jitsu practitioner, mixed martial artist and submission wrestler. He is a two-time World Black Belt Absolute (open weight) World Jiu-Jitsu Champion, five-time World Black Belt Heavy Weight Champion, and three-time World Black Belt Pro Division Champion.

Biography
Xande was born in Manaus, Amazonas Brazil. He began training Jiu-Jitsu at the Associacao Monteiro de Jiu-Jitsu under the supervision of Binho, Guto, Yano e Lucinho Monteiro. He moved to the US in 2002 and lived in Toledo, Ohio, for five years, after which in 2007 he moved to San Diego, California, where he founded the University of Jiu-Jitsu and was the brand ambassador of Ribeiro Jiu-Jitsu. Now Xande lives in Austin, TX, where he teaches at his School Six Blades Jiu-Jitsu Austin and coordinate his team and affiliation schools under the Six Blades Jiu-Jitsu Team.

After a long time away from competition, Xande decided to make a return in 2020 and competed in several superfights. This culminated in an attempt to After competing at the IBJJF World Championships in 2022, he announced his intention to retire permanently from IBJJF competition. After one final competition at the 2022 ADCC world championships, Xande announced that he would also be retiring from this competition format as well.

Ribeiro's brother Saulo Ribeiro is also a Jiu-jitsu and submission wrestling champion. They have both won multiple ADCC and together, they hold the most titles in World Brazilian jiu-jitsu Championships.

Mixed martial arts record

|-
| Win
| align=center| 2–0
| Keiichiro Yamamiya
| KO (punch)
| World Victory Road Presents: Sengoku 8
| 
| align=center| 3
| align=center| 0:51
| Tokyo, Japan
| 
|-
| Win
| align=center| 1–0
| Takashi Sugiura
| TKO (knees and punches)
| World Victory Road Presents: Sengoku 5
| 
| align=center| 3
| align=center| 4:18
| Tokyo, Japan
|

See also
 List of Brazilian Jiu-Jitsu practitioners

References

External links
 
 Official Site of Six Blades Jiu-Jitsu Association
 Ribeiro Jiu-Jitsu
 Saulo & Xande Ribeiro's University of Jiu Jitsu
 Official Site of Xande Ribeiro
 Alexandre Ribeiro "Xande" Facts Bio

1981 births
Brazilian expatriate sportspeople in the United States
Brazilian male judoka
Brazilian male mixed martial artists
Brazilian practitioners of Brazilian jiu-jitsu
People awarded a black belt in Brazilian jiu-jitsu
Light heavyweight mixed martial artists
Mixed martial artists utilizing Brazilian jiu-jitsu
Mixed martial artists utilizing judo
Living people
World Brazilian Jiu-Jitsu Championship medalists
World No-Gi Brazilian Jiu-Jitsu Championship medalists
IBJJF Hall of Fame inductees
People from Manaus
Sportspeople from Amazonas (Brazilian state)
Brazilian jiu-jitsu practitioners who have competed in MMA (men)